Stirling railway station is a railway station on the Transperth network. It is located on the Joondalup line, nine kilometres from Perth station serving the suburb of Stirling.

History
Stirling station opened on 28 February 1993 in the median strip of the Mitchell Freeway. Before Stirling was constructed, the Northern Suburbs Transit System considered a deviation of the rail alignment to directly service Innaloo and its shopping district. However, this idea was rejected by both the project coordinators and the public at large due to the significant cost, lack of identifiable benefits, and environmental impact. The station's location presented some interesting design challenges as the road reserve for the future Stephenson Highway ran in an area directly over the station at the southern end of its platforms. During the design of the station and its approach roads, the engineering firm Ove Arup & Partners was tasked with investigating and designing road layouts to accommodate for both future and current needs. 

Innaloo bus station on Oswald Street was the terminus for most bus routes until 1992; these now terminate at Stirling station. A pair of crossovers link the two mainline tracks at the Perth end of the station, allowing the turnback of train services in the event of a disruption in either direction.

In 2003, the contract for extending the platforms on seven Joondalup line stations, including Stirling station, was awarded to Lakis Constructions. Along with the extensions, the platform edges were upgraded to bring them into line with tactile paving standards. Work on this station was done in mid-2004.

On 12 December 2020 the WA Government announced a $90 million upgrade to the Stirling Bus Interchange. The upgrade will increase the station's number of bus stands from 18 to 30, with completion expected in late 2023.

Services
Stirling station is served by Transperth Joondalup line services.

Stirling station saw 1,468,098 passengers in the 2013–14 financial year.

Platforms
Platforms currently in use are as follows:

Bus routes

References

External links

Joondalup line
Railway stations in Perth, Western Australia
Railway stations in Australia opened in 1993
City of Stirling
Transperth railway stations in highway medians
Bus stations in Perth, Western Australia